KMT often refers to Kuomintang, a political party in Republic of China (Taiwan).

KMT or kmt may also refer to:
 "KMT" (song), a 2017 song by Drake
 Kmt (magazine), a magazine on ancient Egypt
 kilometre-tonne or kmt, a unit of payload-distance
 King in Council (Sweden) or K.M:t, a term of constitutional importance that was used in Sweden before 1975 when the 1974 Instrument of Government came into force
 km.t, a name for ancient Egypt using the hieroglyph Km
 Kartu multi-trip (KMT). Card for KRL Commuterline